Tomás Ezequiel Guidara (born 13 March 1996) is an Argentine professional footballer who plays as a right-back for Vélez Sarsfield.

Club career
Guidara's career started with Belgrano at the age of 16 in the club's youth system. He signed a professional contract on 12 June 2017, prior to making his first-team debut in the Argentine Primera División on 22 June in a 2–1 win against Newell's Old Boys; he played the full match as he did a week later versus Huracán. Those were his only appearances in 2016–17, while he received his first career red card in the first match of 2017–18 in a defeat to Banfield. Guidara penned a new contract with Belgrano on 26 April 2018. June 2019 saw the right-back agree a move away following 2018–19 relegation, as he signed an agreement with Vélez Sarsfield.

International career
Guidara is eligible to represent both Argentina and Albania.

Career statistics
.

References

External links

1996 births
Living people
Footballers from Córdoba, Argentina
Argentine people of Albanian descent
Argentine footballers
Association football defenders
Argentine Primera División players
Club Atlético Belgrano footballers
Club Atlético Vélez Sarsfield footballers